"Tonite Is a Wonderful Time to Fall in Love" (sometimes spelt at "Tonight" rather than "Tonite") is a song by Canadian rock band April Wine. The song was written in 1974 by lead singer Myles Goodwyn and was released in 1975 as the second single from the band's album Stand Back (1975). The song was popular in Canada in 1975, peaking at number 5 on the Canadian Hot 100. It has remained one of April Wine's most popular songs.

Content
"Tonite Is a Wonderful Time to Fall in Love" has a mid-range tempo, and simple lyrics that talk about a man and woman meeting for the first time at the beginning of summer, and the woman states to the man that "tonight is a wonderful time to fall in love".

Chart positions

Weekly charts

Year-end charts

References

April Wine songs
1975 songs
1975 singles
Songs written by Myles Goodwyn